The Peace of Tyrnau or Treaty of Nagyszombat was signed on 6 May 1615 between Holy Roman Emperor Matthias and Gábor Bethlen. Based on the terms of the treaty, Bethlen was recognized as the Prince of Transylvania.

Tyrnau is the German name of the Slovak city of Trnava, also called Nagyszombat in Hungarian, located in western Slovakia,  to the north-east of Bratislava, on the Trnávka river.

See also
List of treaties

External links
Encyclopædia Britannica - Austria
The Outbreak of the Thirty Years' War - Chapter I

1615 in Europe
Treaties of the Holy Roman Empire
1615 treaties
Treaties of the Kingdom of Hungary (1000–1918)